The highlight of the 1996–97 St. Louis Blues season was, after losing Wayne Gretzky the Blues were in turmoil as an ugly public feud between Brett Hull and coach Mike Keenan developed. This was the last season until early 2009, that a huge Blue note would appear at center ice.

Offseason
After losing captain Wayne Gretzky to free-agency, the Blues were in turmoil as an ugly public feud between Brett Hull and Coach Mike Keenan developed, as the Blues got off to a slow start. On December 19 the Keenan era would come to a sudden end as he is fired as GM and Coach. Eventually he would be replaced by assistant coach Jim Roberts.

Roberts' stint as interim head coach lasted nine games, as the team would hire Colorado Avalanche assistant coach Joel Quenneville to serve as the team's head coach. The change worked with Quenneville behind the bench as the Blues recovered and made the playoffs for the 18th straight season with a 36–35–11 record. However, once again the Blues would make a quick exit in the playoffs as they are beaten by the Detroit Red Wings in 6 games.

Regular season

Final standings

Schedule and results

Playoffs

The Blues lost 4 games to 2 to the Detroit Red Wings in the first round.

Player statistics

Regular season
Scoring

Goaltending

Playoffs
Scoring

Goaltending

Draft picks
St. Louis's draft picks at the 1996 NHL Entry Draft held at the Kiel Center in St. Louis, Missouri.

See also
 1996–97 NHL season

References
 Blues on Hockey Database

S
S
St. Louis Blues seasons
St
St